Anne Hykkelbjerg (born 16 January 2000) is a Danish handball player who currently plays for Viborg HK.

She is also a part of Denmark's national recruit team in handball.

References

2000 births
Living people
Danish female handball players
21st-century Danish women